Delial Brewster (born 7 November 1997) is an English professional footballer who played as a forward.

An athletic attacker, he began his professional career with Everton in July 2015. He did not make a first team appearance for the club, but did play on loan at non-league sides Stockport County and Southport. He signed with Chesterfield in June 2017.

Playing career

Everton
Brewster switched from the Academy at Liverpool to the Academy at Everton at the age of 12. He signed his first professional contract, to run for two years, in July 2015. On 22 December 2015, he joined Stockport County on loan in the National League North. He scored on his senior debut four days later, in a 2–1 defeat to Harrogate Town at Edgeley Park. He scored two goals in five matches for Neil Young's "Hatters".

He made two substitute appearances for Everton U23's in the EFL Trophy early in the 2016–17 season. On 1 January 2017, he joined National League club Southport on loan until the end of the 2016–17 season. The loan spell was cut short on 19 February after he was not named in a matchday squad for six games following Andy Preece succession of manager Steve Burr. He was released by Everton in June 2017.

Chesterfield
On 15 June 2017, he signed with newly relegated EFL League Two side Chesterfield. On 9 January 2018, he joined National League North side Chorley on loan until the end of the season. On 18 June 2018, he left Chesterfield by mutual consent.

He spent the start of the 2018/19 season playing for Northern Premier League Premier Division side Witton Albion making 13 appearances in all competitions before leaving the club in January 2019.

Style of play
The Everton club website described Brewster as a forward with "power, pace and an eye for goal".

Statistics

References

External links

1997 births
Living people
Footballers from Southport
Black British sportspeople
English footballers
Association football forwards
Liverpool F.C. players
Everton F.C. players
Stockport County F.C. players
Southport F.C. players
Chesterfield F.C. players
National League (English football) players
English Football League players